2013 Pakistan gas bus explosion occurred on 25 May 2013 after a gas cylinder exploded in a school minivan heading towards Gujrat in Pakistan. The blast killed at least 17 people, including 16 children and a bus driver and another 7 children were wounded. The children were aged between 6 and 12.

Cause
The fire was reportedly caused by a spark when the driver of the dual-fuel bus switched from gas to petrol. Officer Ijaz Ahmad said a short-circuit next to a leaking petrol tank started the blaze. Police had earlier blamed an exploding natural gas cylinder.

References

2013 disasters in Pakistan
Explosions in 2013
Gas explosions
Pakistan gas bus explosion
Bus incidents in Pakistan
History of Punjab, Pakistan (1947–present)
May 2013 events in Pakistan